Hydrobryum is a genus of flowering plants belonging to the family Podostemaceae.

Its native range is Nepal to Japan and Indo-China.

Species:

Hydrobryum austrolaoticum 
Hydrobryum bifoliatum 
Hydrobryum chiangmaiense 
Hydrobryum chompuense 
Hydrobryum clandestinum 
Hydrobryum floribundum 
Hydrobryum griffithii 
Hydrobryum hapteron 
Hydrobryum japonicum 
Hydrobryum kaengsophense 
Hydrobryum khaoyaiense 
Hydrobryum koribanum 
Hydrobryum loeicum 
Hydrobryum luangnamtaense 
Hydrobryum mandaengense 
Hydrobryum micrantherum 
Hydrobryum minutale 
Hydrobryum nakaiense 
Hydrobryum phetchabunense 
Hydrobryum phurueanum 
Hydrobryum puncticulatum 
Hydrobryum ramosum 
Hydrobryum somranii 
Hydrobryum stellatum 
Hydrobryum subcrustaceum 
Hydrobryum subcylindricoides 
Hydrobryum subcylindricum 
Hydrobryum taeniatum 
Hydrobryum takakioides 
Hydrobryum tardhuangense 
Hydrobryum varium 
Hydrobryum verrucosum 
Hydrobryum vientianense

References

Podostemaceae
Malpighiales genera